The Permanent Representative of the United Kingdom to the United Nations Conference on Disarmament is the United Kingdom's foremost diplomatic representative to the Conference on Disarmament in Geneva. Permanent Representatives normally hold the personal rank of Ambassador. 

The Conference on Disarmament was formally established in 1979; this list includes chief diplomats to the preceding Eighteen-Nation Committee on Disarmament (1962–68) and Conference of the Committee on Disarmament (1969–78). In the early years of the Eighteen-Nation Committee the UK delegation was led by the Minister of State for Foreign Affairs, Joseph Godber (later Lord Godber of Willington) with a diplomat, Sir Paul Mason, as resident alternate.

List of permanent representatives
1962–1964: Sir Paul Mason (Alternate Delegate to Minister of State) 
1964–1967: Harold Beeley (UK Representative) 
1967–1971: Ivor Porter (Minister 1967–68, then Ambassador) 
1971–1974: Henry Hainworth
1974–1977: Mark Allen
1977–1979: Derick Ashe
1979–1982: David Summerhayes 
1982–1987: Ian Cromartie 
1987–1992: Tessa Solesby 
1992–1997: Sir Michael Weston
1997–2001: Ian Soutar
2001–2004: David Broucher
2004–2006: John Freeman
2006–2011: John Duncan 
2011–2013: Joanne Adamson
2013–2018: Matthew Rowland 

2018–: Aidan Liddle

References

External links
UK and the United Nations (Geneva), gov.uk
Conference on Disarmament, United Nations Office at Geneva

United Nations Conference on Disarmament
United Kingdom